Cris Valerio is an American business news anchor and interviewer.  She currently is the host of Bloomberg Television's small business and entrepreneurship show, "Venture." Cris joined Bloomberg after working in local television. At Bloomberg she has covered commodities for the Spanish-language channel, as an affiliate reporter and was also the NYSE reporter until her recent transfer to San Francisco where she covers tech, Silicon Valley, and VC firms.

References

American television news anchors
Living people
Bloomberg L.P. people
American women television journalists
Year of birth missing (living people)
21st-century American women